= 4th Division (Finland) =

The 4th Division was a unit of the Finnish Army during the Winter War. It was part of the II Corps (II AK) which fought on the Karelian Isthmus. The 4th Division was responsible for the front between the Gulf of Finland and Viipuri.

== Commanders ==
- B. Nordenswan ( – 6 December 1939)
- A. Kaila (6 December 1939 – 1 March 1940)
- J. Arajuuri (1 March 1940 – ? )
